The Pober Super Ace was a single-seat sports aircraft designed as a homebuilt aircraft by Orland Corben in 1935. Originally the "Corben Super Ace," it was an evolution of the Corben Baby Ace, and closely linked with it throughout their existence.

It was a single-seat parasol wing monoplane of conventional tailwheel configuration. As published, the plans called for an engine from a Ford Model A (some say Ford Model B) to be modified to power the aircraft.

A set of plans and construction articles appeared in Popular Aviation between April and October 1935 and were later marketed by Orland Corben.

Rights to the aircraft were sold to Paul Poberezny with the rest of the Corben company's assets. Plans are  offered for sale by Acro Sport.

Variants
Baby Ace
Single-seat 
Super Ace 
Single-seat powered by a Ford Model A Automotive engine. Plans updated by EAA founder Paul Poberezny.
Jr. Ace
Two-seat tandem variant. 
Pober Jr Ace
Updated plans of the Jr. Ace model

Specifications

External links
Ace Aircraft Manufacturing Company
The History of Ace Aircraft

References

 

Homebuilt aircraft
1930s United States sport aircraft
Single-engined tractor aircraft
Super Ace
Parasol-wing aircraft
Acro Sport aircraft